Glória is a Portuguese historical thriller drama television series. It was released on 5 November 2021 and is the first Netflix production originating in Portugal. It tells the story of a young spy operating in Cold-War Portugal, amid the intrigues of the US and Soviet Union. According to Variety, the show cost 6 million euros to produce, making it the most expensive series in Portuguese television history.

Synopsis
In the small village of Glória do Ribatejo, João Vidal is recruited as a spy for the KGB. It is the 1960s, at the height of the Cold War, and both the Soviets and Americans are attempting to manipulate events to their respective advantage and gain strategic control of Europe. Vidal undertakes high-risk espionage missions that have the potential to change the course of Portuguese and world history.

Cast and characters

Main

Recurring

Episodes

Notes

References

External links
 
 

2020s Portuguese television series
2021 Portuguese television series debuts
Portuguese drama television series
Portuguese historical television series
Portuguese-language Netflix original programming
Television shows set in Portugal
Television shows filmed in Portugal